Bandeira is a Portuguese surname. Notable people with the surname include:

Alda Bandeira (born 1949), politician in São Tomé and Príncipe
Bárbara Bandeira (born 2001), Portuguese pop singer
Manuel Bandeira (1886–1968), Brazilian poet, literary critic, and translator
Moniz Bandeira (born 1935), Brazilian writer, professor, political scientist, historian, and poet

Portuguese-language surnames